Zhu Yunying (born 15 January 1978) is a Chinese former volleyball player who competed as a backup setter in the 1996 and 2000 Summer Olympics.

References

1978 births
Living people
Olympic volleyball players of China
Volleyball players at the 2000 Summer Olympics
Volleyball players from Shanghai
Asian Games medalists in volleyball
Volleyball players at the 1998 Asian Games
Chinese women's volleyball players
Medalists at the 1998 Asian Games
Asian Games gold medalists for China
20th-century Chinese women